This is a list of the music featured in the television series La Femme Nikita. Each song listed appears under its relevant episode according to air date.

Songs featured in each episode

Season 1
Episode 1: "Nikita"
 Chainsuck – Big Mistake
 Philosopher Kings – All To Myself
 Thrive – Revenge
 Rose Chronicles – Blood Red
 Tristan Psionic – 3AM

Episode 2: "Friend"
 Huevos Rancheros – Night of the Iguana
 Merlin – Last Playboy Interview

Episode 3: "Simone"
 Kat Rocket – Slacker Boy Blue
 Mark Stewart – Red Zone
 Christoph von Gluck – Chi Mai Dell'Erebo (from the opera Orfeo ed Euridice, Act 2, Scene 1)
 Christoph von Gluck – O You Shades Whom I Implore  (from the opera Orfeo ed Euridice, Act 2, Scene 4)
 Christoph von Gluck – Recitative (from the opera Orfeo ed Euridice)

Episode 4: "Charity"
 Philosopher Kings – All Dressed Up in San Francisco
 Holly Cole Trio – Jersey Girl
 Clove – In Your Life
 SIANspheric – Watch Me Fall
 Tristan Psionic – All Of The Important Things I've Done

Episode 5: "Mother"
 Original music composed by Sean Callery: New Life

Episode 6: "Love"
 Big Sugar – Standing Around Crying
 Big Rude Jake – Night of the King Snake
 Big Sugar – Still Waiting
 Filter – Hey Man Nice Shot
 Clove – News
 Moonsocket – Expressions of Loneliness

Episode 7: "Treason"
 Diego Marulanda – La Cumbia, La Cumbia
 Diego Marulanda – La Noche
 Sister Machine Gun – Red

Episode 8: "Escape"
 Beverly Klass – Temple
 Rhea's Obsession – Cun Lacoudhir (The Breaking Ice)
 Rose Chronicles – Torn
 Tara MacLean – Evidence

Episode 9: "Gray"
 Guru Stefan – Tsunami
 Morcheeba – Howling

Episode 10: "Choice"
 Rhea's Obsession – Death by Moonlight
 Vibrolux – Drown

Episode 11: "Rescue"
 Enigma – Beyond the Invisible

Episode 12: "Innocent"
 In the Nursery – Precedent

Episode 13: "Recruit"
 SIANspheric – Broken Man

Episode 14: "Gambit"
 Original music composed by Sean Callery: Get Over It

Episode 15: "Obsessed"
 Garbage – #1 Crush
 In the Nursery – Woman

Episode 16: "Noise"
 Afro-Celt Sound System – Inion
 Morcheeba – Tape Loop

Episode 17: "War"
 DJ Keoki – Majick
 Original music composed by Sean Callery: Swinging Cages

 Episode 18 Missing"
 Morphine – Hanging on a Curtain

Episode 19: "Voices"
 In the Nursery – Mandra
 SIANspheric – The Stars Above
 Vibrolux – Ground

Episode 20: "Brainwash"
 Gang Chen, He Zhan Hao – The Butterfly Lovers Violin Concerto

Episode 21: "Verdict"
 PJ Harvey – Working for the Man

Episode 22: "Mercy"
 Depeche Mode – The Love Thieves
 Rodgers and Hart – My Romance – Jazz version

Season 2
Episode 1: "Hard Landing"
 Depeche Mode – The Love Thieves
 Original music composed by Sean Callery: Reunited

Episode 2: "Spec Ops"
 Orbital – Satan
 Prodigy – Smack My Bitch Up

Episode 3: "Third Person"
 Headrillaz – Weird Planet

Episode 4: "Approaching Zero"
 Les Jumeaux – Carrousella
 Sweetback – Gaze
 Sister Machine Gun – Burn

Episode 5: "New Regime"
 Sarah McLachlan – Do What You Have To Do
 Pilgrimage – Path to the Invisible

Episode 6: "Mandatory Refusal"
 Curve – Chinese Burn [Flood Mix version]
 DJ Krush (featuring Deborah Anderson) – Skin Against Skin

Episode 7: "Half Life"
 Beth Orton – Tangent
 Jacques Brel – Les Bourgeois (sang by Denis Forest)

Episode 8: "Darkness Visible"
 Original music composed by Sean Callery

Episode 9: "Open Heart"
 Original music composed by Sean Callery

Episode 10: "First Mission"
 Original music composed by Sean Callery

Episode 11: "Psychic Pilgrim"
 Original music composed by Sean Callery: Nikita Contacting the Spirit World

Episode 12: "Soul Sacrifice"
 Adam F – Dirty Harry (Grooverider remix)
 Juno Reactor – Komit

Episode 13: "Not Was"
 Jerusalem Salsa Band – Oye Me Israel
 Mimi Goese – Fire and Roses

Episode 14: "Double Date"
 Fluke – Absurd
 Garbage – #1 Crush
 Mono – Life in Mono
 Propellerheads – Take California

Episode 15: "Fuzzy Logic"

Episode 16: "Old Habits"
 DJ Keoki – Space
 The Crystal Method – (Can't You) Trip Like I Do

Episode 17: "Inside Out"

Episode 18: "Off Profile"
 Hednoize – Loaded Gun
 Morcheeba – Fear and Love
 Massive Attack – Angel

Episode 19: "Last Night"
 Diana Krall – Gentle Rain
 Mono – Silicone

Episode 20: "In Between"
 Esthero – Superheroes
 Stereolab – Refractions In The Plastic Pulse

Episode 21: "Adrian's Garden"
 Gus Gus – Gun

Episode 22: "End Game"

Season 3
Episode 1: "Looking For Michael"
 Gearwhore – 11-11
 Mickey Hart – Temple Caves
 Original music composed by Sean Callery: Searching for Michael

Episode 2: "Someone Else's Shadow"
 Mandalay – Please

Episode 3: "Opening Night Jitters"
 Autour de Lucie – Chanson Sans Issue (Ne Vois-Tu Pas) Remix (Bonus Track)
 Gus Gus – Is Jesus Your Pal

Episode 4: "Gates Of Hell"
 Gabriel Fauré – Élégie, Op. 24
 Gus Gus – Is Jesus Your Pal

Episode 5: "Imitation Of Death"
 Love Spirals Downwards – Sunset Bell

Episode 6: "Love And Country"

Episode 7: "Cat And Mouse"
 Lamb – Gorecki

Episode 8: "Outside The Box"
 Thrive – Revenge
 Vibrolux – Superstar
 Sixty Channels – Ride with the Flow

Episode 9: "Slipping Into Darkness"

Episode 10: "Under The Influence"
 Hooverphonic – Eden

Episode 11: "Walk On By"

Episode 12: "Threshold Of Pain"
 Moa – Can't Forget You
 Original music composed by Sean Callery: Saying good-bye

Episode 13: "Beyond The Pale"
 Françoise Hardy – Ma Jeunesse Fout Le Camp

Episode 14: "Hand To Hand"
 Makyo – The Third Gate of Dreams
 Rhea's Obsession – Death by Moonlight

Episode 15: "Before I Sleep"
 Cream – I Feel Free

Episode 16: "I Remember Paris"
 Christoph von Gluck – Recitative
 Original music composed by Sean Callery: Leaving Paris

Episode 17: "All Good Things"
 Craig Armstrong (featuring Elizabeth Fraser) – This Love
 Original music composed by Sean Callery: Waterfront Shootout

Episode 18: "Third Party Ripoff"
 Afro-Celt Sound System (featuring Sinéad O'Connor; Iarla O¨Liomaird) – Release
 Original music composed by Sean Callery: Bathtub for Two

Episode 19: "Any Means Necessary"

Episode 20: "Three Eyed Turtle"

Episode 21: "Playing With Fire"
 David Sylvian – Thalheim

Episode 22: "On Borrowed Time"
 Hooverphonic – This Strange Effect
 Original music composed by Sean Callery: Push the button, Nikita

Season 4
Episode 1: "Getting Out Of Reverse"
 Lamb – Lullaby
 Lunatic Calm – Leave You Far Behind

Episode 2: "There Are No Missions"
 Everything But The Girl – No Difference
 Kill Transmission – Despair

Episode 3: "View Of The Garden"
 Original music composed by Sean Callery

Episode 4: "Into The Looking Glass"
 Makyo – Chandan

Episode 5: "Man In The Middle"
 Death in Vegas – Death Threat
 Gus Gus – Teenage Sensation
 Sofa Surfers – Sofa Rockers Richard Dorfmeister Remix

Episode 6: "Love, Honor and Cherish"
 Original music composed by Sean Callery

Episode 7: "Sympathy For The Devil"
 Iron Butterfly – In-A-Gadda-Da-Vida

Episode 8: "No One Lives Forever"
 Jennifer Meller aka Jen Beast (written by Bob Mair & Joel Wachbrit) – Unglued

Episode 9: "Down A Crooken Path"
 Original music composed by Sean Callery

Episode 10: "He Came From Four"
 DJ Keoki (Dimension 23) – I.M.O.K.R.U.O.K. (Remixed)

 Episode 11 Time To Be Heroes"
 Hardknox – Attitude
 Kill Transmission – Dying Wish
 Rob Zombie – Subliminal Seduction – Living Dead Girl (remix)
 Original music composed by Sean Callery: Everything Happened So Fast

Episode 12: "Hell Hath No Fury"
 Original music composed by Sean Callery

Episode 13: "Kiss The Past Good-bye"
 Original music composed by Sean Callery

Episode 14: "Line In The Sand"
 Frédéric Chopin – Nocturn Op. 15 No. 3 in G Minor

Episode 15: "Abort, Fail, Retry, Terminate"

Episode 16: "Catch A Falling Star"
 Ernest Tubb – I Ain't Been Right Since You Went Wrong
 Ernest Tubb – Give Me an Old Fashion Love
 Neko Case and Her Boyfriends – Guided Wire
 Neko Case and Her Boyfriends – No Need To Cry
 Neko Case and Her Boyfriends – Thrice All American
 Patsy Cline – Crazy

Episode 17: "Sleeping With The Enemy"
 Enigma – Modern Crusaders
 Rob Zombie – Dragula

Episode 18: "Toys In The Basement"
 Tom Tykwer/J. Klimek/R. Heil – Supermarket

Episode 19: "Time Out Of Mind"

Episode 20: "Face In The Mirror"

Episode 21: "Up The Rabbit Hole"
 Sarah McLachlan – I Love You
 Original music composed by Sean Callery: Reunited
 Original music composed by Sean Callery: Defection

Episode 22: "Four Light Years Farther"
 Dot Allison – Tomorrow Never Comes

Season 5
Episode 1: "Déjà Vu All Over Again"
 PJ Harvey – Big Exit

Episode 2: "A Girl Who Wasn't There"
 Nancy Wilson and Cannonball Adderley – Save Your Love For Me

Episode 3: "In Through The Out Door"
 The Experiment – The Cost of Freedom
 Juno Reactor – Badimo

Episode 4: "All The World's A Stage"
 Euphoria (featuring G. Webster) – Powerdrive
 Hardrive 2000 (featuring Lynae) – Never Forget (When You Touch Me)
 Ingrid Kertesi – Bist Du Bei Mir, attributed to JS Bach, but of Stölzel
 W. Sommers – Sad Noodle

Episode 5: "The Man Behind The Curtain"
 Emissary (featuring Beverly Klass) – Scarlet Skies

Episode 6: "The Evil That Men Do"
 Coldplay – We Never Change
 Juno Reactor – High Energy Protons (Orion remix)

Episode 7: "Let No Man Put Asunder"
 Mandalay – Enough Love

Episode 8: "A Time For Every Purpose"
 Autour de Lucie – Immobile
 Coldplay – Spies
 Future Sound of London – Expander
 Original music composed by Sean Callery: Always Trust Your Father

External links
 http://www.cynbythesea.com/
 http://members.aol.com/Cusmus2/music2.html
 https://web.archive.org/web/20060604203454/http://www.tvtrecords.com/artists/?art_id=00092
 http://www.soundtrack.net/albums/database/?id=2774
 http://lfn.clan.su/
 For those looking for the song by Merlin: http://www.themusichutch.com/listen-song/merlin-last-playboy-interview-1x02-friendamiche/88051/

La Femme Nikita